Mykhaylo Ivanovych Khromey (born 19 November 2003) is a Ukrainian professional footballer who plays as a central midfielder for Shakhtar Donetsk.

Career
Khromey is a product of Shakhtar Donetsk youth sportive school system. He made his debut for Mariupol in the Ukrainian Premier League as a substitute player in the away match against Lviv on 23 July 2021 which ended with a draw.

References

External links
 
 

2003 births
Living people
Sportspeople from Ivano-Frankivsk
Ukrainian footballers
Ukraine youth international footballers
Association football midfielders
FC Shakhtar Donetsk players
FC Mariupol players
Ukrainian Premier League players